Valentine Tsamma Seane  (born 2 November 1966) is the former bishop of the Roman Catholic Diocese of Gaborone at the Christ the King Cathedral in Gaborone, Botswana. He is the second Motswana to be a bishop in Botswana.

Biography
Valentine Tsamma Seane was born in Lobatse, Botswana and was ordained a priest on 19 March 1994. Seane was appointed bishop of the Diocese of Gaborone on 5 February 2009 and ordained 25 April 2009.

On 9 August 2017, Pope Francis ordered his dismissal from office.

Controversy
Seane has been involved in controversy surrounding his consecration. Supporters of Father Johannes Kgaodi, a priest at the Corpus Catholic Church in Broadhurst, have stated that Kgaodi is the rightful successor to the title of bishop. The faction cites Seane's insistence of renting a 2 million pula (US$312,000 as of April 2011) house using the church's money instead of using the one provided by the church as a questionable and corrupt act as bishop.

See also
Diocese of Gaborone

References

External links

GCatholic.org
Diocese of Gaborone

21st-century Roman Catholic bishops in Botswana
1966 births
Living people
Roman Catholic bishops of Gaborone
Botswana Roman Catholic bishops